Uzucha is a genus of moths of the family Xyloryctidae.

Species
 Uzucha borealis Turner, 1898
 Uzucha humeralis Walker, 1864

References

Xyloryctidae
Xyloryctidae genera